Robin Jason Sims (born 22 November 1970) is a former English cricketer.  Sims was a left-handed batsman who occasionally fielded as a wicket-keeper.  He was born at Hillingdon, Middlesex.

Having played Second XI cricket for Middlesex since 1987,  Sims made his first-class debut for the county against the touring Pakistanis in 1992.  He made three further first-class appearances for the county, the last of which came against Somerset in the 1993 County Championship.  In his four first-class appearances for Middlesex, he scored a total of 31 runs at an average of 10.33, with a high score of 28.  Sims also played List A cricket for the county, with his debut in that format coming against Leicestershire in the 1992 Sunday League.  He made nine further List A appearances, the last of which came against Somerset in the 1993 AXA Equity & Law League.  In his ten List A appearances, he scored a total of 83 runs at an average of 27.66, with a high score of 27 not out.

Arguably his most notable moment on a cricket field came during the 1989 Ashes, when in the 2nd Test at Lord's Cricket Ground, he caught Australian captain Allan Border.

References

External links
Robin Sims at ESPNcricinfo
Robin Sims at CricketArchive

1970 births
Living people
People from Hillingdon
English cricketers
Middlesex cricketers